Derick Close (born 13 May 1927 in Bowes, County Durham, England) was a former international motorcycle speedway rider who reached the final of Speedway World Championship in 1952.

Career
Close started his career with the Middlesbrough Bears in 1947 followed by a short spell on loan with the Newcastle Diamonds at the start of 1948. He returned to the Bears and established himself in the team. In 1949 he rejoined Newcastle where he spent the next three seasons before joining the Lanarkshire Eagles mid season in 1951.

The 1952 season proved to be the best of his career after receiving a call up to ride for England despite riding in National League Division Two, having never ridden in the top flight. He also reached the final of the Speedway World Championship. In 1953 he suffered a fractured skull and although he rode well again in 1954 he suffered a drop in form after joining the Leicester Hunters in 1955 and retired at the end of the season.

World final appearances
 1952 –  London, Wembley Stadium – 14th – 4pts

References

1927 births
Year of death missing
British speedway riders
English motorcycle racers
Newcastle Diamonds riders
Leicester Hunters riders
People from Barnard Castle
Sportspeople from County Durham